Josh Thomas may refer to:

Arts and entertainment
Josh Thomas (blues guitarist) (born 1970), Australian blues guitarist
Josh Thomas (comedian) (born 1987), Australian comedian, actor and writer

Sports

American football
Josh Thomas (defensive end) (born 1981), American football defensive end
Josh Thomas (cornerback) (born 1989), American football cornerback
Josh Thomas (safety) (born 1996), American football safety

Other sports
Josh Thomas (Australian footballer) (born 1991), Australian rules footballer for Collingwood
Josh Thomas (footballer, born 1999), English footballer
Josh Thomas (rugby union) (born 2000), Welsh rugby union player
Josh Thomas (cricketer), West Indian cricketer

See also
Joshua Mark Thomas (born 1973), American interior designer and photographer